Nilakantheswar Mahavidyalaya Degree Mahavidyalaya(NM) is in the South Balanda area of Talcher, Odisha, India. It was established in 1992. It was started as a tutorial college with the name of Nilakatheswar Vidyapeeth (+2) in 1987 to fulfill the dreams of higher education for the children of Mahanadi Coalfields Limited employees as well as local people. In 1989 it was recognized by the government of Odisha and affiliated to the Council of Higher Secondary Education, Odisha.

References

External links
 Nilakantheswar Mahavidyalaya

Universities and colleges in Odisha
Angul district
1992 establishments in Orissa
Educational institutions established in 1992